Birnbaum (English: Pear tree) is a painting by Gustav Klimt from his Golden phase. This painting was painted in 1903, and today is housed in Busch-Reisinger Museum, Harvard University Art Museums, United States. Klimt finished this painting during his stay in Litzlberg on Lake Attersee.

References

1903 paintings
Paintings by Gustav Klimt
Paintings in the Harvard Art Museums